Butyrea luteoalba is a species of fungus belonging to the family Steccherinaceae.

It has cosmopolitan distribution.

Synonym:
 Junghuhnia luteoalba (P. Karst.) Ryvarden, 1972

References

Steccherinaceae